Heide is a surname and feminine given name. Heide is a German and Dutch word meaning "heath".

Notable people with this surname
Ella Heide (1871–1956), Danish painter
Frits Heide (1883–1957), Danish botanist 
Florence Parry Heide (1919–2011), American children's writer
Hermann auf der Heide (1911–1984), German field hockey player
Michael von der Heide (born 1971), Swiss musician, singer, and actor
Oscar Louis Auf der Heide (1874–1945), American politician
Ola Heide (born 1931), Norwegian botanist
Raoul Heide (1888–1978), Norwegian fencer
Ruud ter Heide (born 1982), Dutch association football player
Tami Heide, American radio personality
Wilma Scott Heide (1921–1985), American feminist author and social activist

Notable people with this given name
Heide Boikat, West German slalom canoeist
Heide-Elke Gaugel (born 1959), German sprinter
Heide Hatry (born 1965), German artist, curator and editor
Heide Orth (born 1942), German tennis player
Heide Perlman (born 1951), American television script writer
Heidemarie Rosendahl (born 1947), German track and field athlete
Heide Rühle (born 1948), German politician
Heide Schröter, West German slalom canoeist
Heide Schmidt (born 1948), Austrian politician
Heide Seyerling (born 1976), South African sprinter
Heide Simonis (born 1943), German politician
Heide Wollert (born 1982), German judoka

See also
Heide (disambiguation)
Van der Heide, Dutch toponymic surname
Heidi (given name), similar but unrelated name
Heyde, surname

German feminine given names